The Tour de Don (1,998 m) is a mountain of the Chablais Alps, located west of Vionnaz in the Swiss canton of Valais. The summit lies about 200 meters east of the border with France.

See also
List of mountains of Switzerland accessible by public transport

References

External links
 Tour de Don on Hikr

Mountains of the Alps
Mountains of Valais
Mountains partially in France
Mountains of Switzerland
One-thousanders of Switzerland